

This is a dynamic list of hot springs in the United States. The Western states in particular are known for their thermal springs: Alaska, Arizona, California, Colorado, Idaho, Montana, Nevada, New Mexico, Oregon, Utah, Washington, Wyoming; but there are interesting hot springs in other states throughout the country. Indigenous peoples' use of thermal springs can be traced back 10,000 years, per archaeological evidence of human use and settlement by Paleo-Indians. These geothermal resources provided warmth, healing mineral water, and cleansing. Hot springs are considered sacred by several Indigenous cultures, and along with sweat lodges have been used for ceremonial purposes. Since ancient times, humans have used hot springs, public baths and thermal medicine for therapeutic effects. Bathing in hot, mineral water is an ancient ritual. The Latin phrase, sanitas per aquam, means "health through water", involving the treatment of disease and various ailments by balneotherapy in natural hot springs.

Many hot springs are natural rock soaking pools that are only accessible on foot or horseback, while others are developed into resort spas.

Alaska

 Ainsworth Hot Springs
 Akutan Hot Springs
 Baranof Warm Springs (thermal mineral springs)
 Chena Hot Springs
 Circle Hot Springs
 Kanuti Hot Springs
 Manley Hot Springs
 Tolovana Hot Springs

Arizona

 Arizona (Ringbolt) Hot Springs
 Buckhorn Baths
 Castle Hot Springs
 Gold Strike Hot Springs
 Hot Well Dunes
 Indian Hot Springs
 Palm Pool Waterfall Hot Springs
 Pumpkin Spring
 Roper Lake State Park Hot Spring
 San Carlos Warm Springs
 Sheep Bridge Warm Spring
 Tonopah
 Verde Hot Springs

Arkansas

 Hot Springs

California

 Avila Hot Springs, Avila
 Big Bend Hot Springs
 Big Caliente Hot Springs, Los Padres National Forest
 Bumpass Hell Creek, Lassen National Park
 Calistoga
 Calistoga Spa Hot Springs
 Campbell Hot Springs, Sierraville CA
 Casa Diablo Hot Springs, California
 Coso Hot Springs, Inyo County
 Crabtree Hot Springs
 Desert Hot Springs (thermal mineral springs)
 Deep Creek Hot Springs
 Delonegha Hot Springs
 Franklin Hot Springs, Paso Robles, California
 Gilroy Yamato Hot Springs
 Grover Hot Springs State Park
 Harbin Hot Springs, Middletown
 Hot Creek
 Jordan Hot Springs (Sequoia National Forest)
 Keough Hot Springs
 Long Valley Caldera
 Mammoth Hot Springs
 Matilija Hot Springs
 Mercey Hot Springs
 Miracle Hot Springs
 Mono Hot Springs
 Murrieta Hot Springs
 Palm Springs
 Remington Hot Springs
 Saline Valley Hot Springs
 Scovern Hot Springs
 Sespe Hot Springs
 Slates Hot Springs, Esalen
 Tassajara Hot Springs
 Travertine Hot Springs
 Warner Springs
 White Sulfur Springs, St. Helena, California 
 Wilbur Hot Springs
 Willett Hot Springs

Colorado

 Conundrum Hot Springs
 Hot Sulphur Springs
 Idaho Springs
 Glenwood Springs
 Orvis Hot Springs
 Ouray
 Pagosa hot springs
 Penny Hot Springs
 Steamboat Springs
 Wiesbaden Hot Springs

Florida
 Warm Mineral Springs, Florida

Georgia
 Radium Hot Springs, Georgia
 Warm Springs, Georgia

Hawaii
 Ahalanui Hot Pond
 Kapoho Warm Springs Tide Pools, some are on private property.
 Pohoiki Warm Spring, one of several warm springs, part of the Isaac Hale Park warm springs system.

Idaho

 Boat Box Hot Spring
 Frenchman's Hot Springs
 Goldbug Hot Springs
 Green Canyon Hot Springs
 Heise Hot Springs, Ririe 
 Hopkins Hot Springs also known as Maple Grove hot springs, Thatcher, Idaho
 Lava Hot Springs
 Silver Creek Plunge
 Stanley Hot Springs
 Sunflower Hot Springs

Illinois
 Little Hot Springs of Illinois

Indiana

 West Baden Springs

Massachusetts
 Sand Spring (75 °F / 24 °C)

Montana
 Chico Hot Springs (104 °F / 40 °C)
 Gregson Hot Springs
 Hot Springs
 Hunters Hot Springs
 Lolo Hot Springs Montana
 Sleeping Buffalo Hot Springs
 Sleeping Child Hot Springs

Nevada

 Ash Springs, N 37 27.810 W 115 11.547 (95 °F)
 Bartine Hot Springs, (105 °F)
 Bathtub Spring, (Soldier Meadows)
 Bog Hot Springs, (105 °F)
 Bowers Mansion Hot Springs, (116 °F)
 Carson Hot Springs, (95°–110 °F)
 Chukar Gulch (Soldier Meadows), (104 °F)
 Crescent View Hot Springs (185 °F)
 Crystal Springs hot springs, Crystal Springs, Nevada ghost town, (81 °F-90 °F)
 Diana's Punchbowl (183°)
 Dry Suzie (Hot Sulphur) Hot Springs, (145 °F)
 Duckwater Pond, (90 °F)
 Dyke Hot Spring, (150 °F)
 Elko Hot Hole
 Fish Lake Hot Well, (120 °F)
 Fly Geyser
 Hot Creek Springs and Marsh Area, (85 °F)
 Hyder Hot Springs, (95°–150 °F)
  Jersey Valley Hot Springs, (120 °F)
 McFarlane Hot Springs, (140°–170 °F)
 New Wagner Warm Spring, (87 °F)
 Panaca Warm Springs, (78°–86 °F)
 Paradise Valley Hot Springs
 Pott's Ranch Hot Spring, (113 °F)
 Pinto Hot Springs (East), (109 °F)
 Reese River Hot Springs (Valley of the Moon), (105 °F)
 Rogers Warm Spring
 Ruby Valley, (106°–122 °F)
 Smith Creek (Rainbow) Hot Springs, (197°)
 Soldier Meadows hot spring system
 Soldier Meadows Hot Creek, (106°–112 °F)
 Soldier Meadows Warm Pond, (85 °F)
 Spencer Hot Springs, (101°)
 Steamboat Hot Well, (204 °F)
 Trego Hot Springs, (185 °F)
 Twelve Mile Hot Springs
 Virgin Valley Hot Springs
 Walker Warm Springs, (110°–120°)

New Mexico

 Black Rock Hot Springs
 Faywood Hot Springs
 Giggling Springs, Jemez Springs, New Mexico
 Gila Hot Springs
 Jemez Springs Bath House, Jemez Springs, New Mexico
 Jordan Hot Springs (New Mexico) (Gila National Forest)
 Manby Hot Springs, also known as Stagecoach Hot Springs, near Taos
 McCauley Hot Springs, Jemez Springs
 Melanie Hot Springs, near Silver City
 Middle Fork Hot Springs also known as Littlefork Hot Springs (Gila National Forest)
 Montezuma Hot Springs, Montezuma, near Las Vegas, New Mexico
 Ojo Caliente Hot Springs
 Radium Hot Springs
 Soda Dam Hot Spring
 San Antonio Hot Springs, Jemez Springs
 Spence Hot Springs, Jemez Springs
 Truth or Consequences Hot Springs
 Turkey Creek Hot Springs (Gila National Forest)

New York

 Lebanon Springs
 Saratoga Springs

North Carolina
 Hot Springs

Oregon

 Alvord Hot Springs
 Antelope Hot Springs
 Bagby Hot Springs
 Belknap Hot Springs
 Breitenbush Hot Springs (thermal mineral springs)
 Cougar Hot Springs
 Deer Creek Hot Springs
 Hot Lake Springs
 Hunters Hot Springs
 McCredie Hot Springs
 Mickey Hot Springs
 Summer Lake Hot Springs
 Umpqua Hot Springs

South Dakota
 Hot Springs

Texas
 Chinati Hot Springs, also known as Ruidosa Hot Springs and Kingston Hot Springs
 Hot Springs (Big Bend National Park)
 Hot Wells (San Antonio, Texas)

Utah

 Baker Hot Springs also known as Crater Spring and Abraham Hot Springs
 Blue Lake, Wendover
 Crystal Hot Springs, Honeyville
 Fifth Water Hot Springs, Three Forks Trailhead, Diamond Fork Canyon, Uinta National Forest
 Homestead, Midway
 Meadow Hot Springs
 Mystic Hot Springs, also known as Monroe Hot Springs and Cooper Hot Springs
 Pa Tempe Hot Springs, La Verkin
 Saratoga Springs
 Veyo Pool, Veyo

Virginia
 Hot Springs
 Warm Springs

Washington
 
 Hot Springs, Washington
 Olympic Hot Springs
 Scenic Hot Springs
 Sol Duc Hot Springs

West Virginia
 Berkeley Springs State Park

Wyoming

 Black Sand Basin Hot Springs
 Boiling River (Yellowstone National Park)
 Brilliant Pool Hot Springs
 Grand Prismatic Spring, (Yellowstone National Park)
 Hot Springs State Park, Thermopolis
 Mammoth Hot Springs,
 Saratoga

See also
 List of hot springs of the world
 List of artesian wells in the United States

References

External links
 
 

Hot springs
Hot springs
Geothermal areas in the United States
Spa towns in the United States
Balneotherapy